Plotvyanka is a rural locality (a khutor) in Volokonovsky District, Belgorod Oblast, Russia. The population was 104 as of 2010. It has only one street.

Geography 
Plotvyanka is located 33 km southwest of Volokonovka (the district's administrative centre) by road. Novoye is the nearest rural locality.

References 

Rural localities in Volokonovsky District